Nigel Cello Lonwijk (born 27 October 2002) is a Dutch professional footballer who plays as a defender for Plymouth Argyle on loan from  club Wolverhampton Wanderers.

Club career
After playing youth football for PSV Eindhoven, Lonwijk signed for Premier League club Wolverhampton Wanderers in January 2020, initially joining their under-18 side. Lonwijk joined the club's under-23 team for the 2020–21 season and appeared on the first-team bench 4 times, but failed to make his debut. On 31 August 2021, Lonwijk signed a new contract with the club, lasting until summer 2023 with the option for an additional year, and also joined Eredivisie club Fortuna Sittard on loan. He made his debut for the club on 12 September 2021 as a substitute in a 3–1 Eredivisie defeat to Sparta Rotterdam.

On 29 July 2022, Lonwijk signed for EFL League One club Plymouth Argyle on loan for the 2022–23 season.

International career
Lonwijk was born in the Netherlands to a Surinamese father and Dutch mother. He has represented the Netherlands at under-16 level.

Style of play
Lonwijk is right-footed and plays as a centre-back. In January 2020, Wolves' head of academy Scott Sellars stated Lonwijk is "very good physically, a good defender one-on-one, and has strong technical ability".

Personal life
Born in Goirle, Lonwijk grew up in Tilburg. He is the younger brother of Justin Lonwijk, who plays for Ukrainian club Dynamo Kyiv, whilst his younger sister Jayden plays tennis.

References

External links
Under-16 national team profile at Onsoranje.nl (in Dutch)

2002 births
Living people
Dutch footballers
Netherlands youth international footballers
Dutch sportspeople of Surinamese descent
People from Goirle
Footballers from North Brabant
Association football defenders
PSV Eindhoven players
Wolverhampton Wanderers F.C. players
Fortuna Sittard players
Plymouth Argyle F.C. players
Eredivisie players
Dutch expatriate footballers
Expatriate footballers in England
Dutch expatriate sportspeople in England